CFP8 may refer to:

 Whitehorse/Cousins Airport (TC LID: CFP8), an airstrip in Canada
 CFP8, a C form-factor pluggable variant